The men's lightweight event was part of the weightlifting programme at the 1936 Summer Olympics. The weight class was the second-lightest contested, and allowed weightlifters of up to 67.5 kilograms (148.8 pounds). The competition was held on Sunday, 2 August 1936. Sixteen weightlifters from twelve nations competed.

Medalists

Records
These were the standing world and Olympic records (in kilograms) prior to the 1936 Summer Olympics.

Robert Fein set a new Olympic record in press with 105 kilograms. Anwar Mesbah set a new Olympic record in snatch with 105 kilograms. Anwar Mesbah also set a new world record in clean and jerk with 145 kilograms. Robert Fein and Anwar Mesbah both set a new world record in total with 342.5 kilograms.

Results

All figures in kilograms.

The bodyweight for all weightlifters is given as before the competition. An Austrian protest was upheld to reweigh the medalists after the event, when both Fein and Mesbah had the same bodyweight, both were awarded gold medals.

References

Sources
 Olympic Report 
 

Lightweight